Squire Trelooby is a 1704 farce by the writers William Congreve, John Vanbrugh and William Walsh. All were members of the Kit-Cat Club and another member Samuel Garth wrote a prologue. It was inspired by the French play Monsieur de Pourceaugnac by Molière.

In 1734 James Ralph wrote The Cornish Squire, a reworking of the play which was staged at Drury Lane Theatre. It was considered a great success, and was followed by another version The Brave Irishman by Thomas Sheridan at Dublin's Smock Alley Theatre in 1744.

References

Bibliography
 Burling, William J. A Checklist of New Plays and Entertainments on the London Stage, 1700–1737. Fairleigh Dickinson Univ Press, 1992.
 Field, Ophelia. The Kit-Cat Club: Friends Who Imagined a Nation. HarperCollins 2009.
 Sheldon, Esther K. Thomas Sheridan of Smock-Alley. Princeton University Press, 2015.

1704 plays
West End plays
Comedy plays
Plays by William Congreve
Plays by John Vanbrugh
Plays by James Ralph